Hato Rey is a former barrio located in the northwest part of the dissolved municipality of Río Piedras. It now stretches over three barrios, of the municipality of San Juan, Puerto Rico:

Urban landscape
Its name means "king's cattle farm" (hato). In the 18th century, cattle would roam among the sugar cane fields in the area. Its proximity to residential areas such as San Juan, Río Piedras, Miramar made it a perfect location from where to produce what its residents would eat.  The area also used to be known as Las Monjas (the nuns) due to a convent that used to be located in the area in the 19th century.

The Northern portion of Hato Rey is a startling contrast between blight and poverty and La Milla de Oro (The Golden Mile), a stretch that effectively covers only one mile but that is home to the headquarters of many large local and international banks. It is one of the most important centers of Puerto Rico and the Caribbean's economy and many upper middle class condominiums are also located here.

Hato Rey is also home to a series of boutiques and restaurants (mostly along Roosevelt Avenue).  The José Miguel Agrelot Coliseum and the Tren Urbano metro system have also reshaped Hato Rey by bringing people and business into the area after work hours. The metro system is also helping to ease traffic woes in the area by decongesting the roads. Phi Sigma Alpha fraternity's main headquarters are located in Mexico Street in Hato Rey. The Hato Rey Lions Club, founded in 1955, is located in Alhambra Street, across from the Polytechnic University.

Because of its location, many commuters travelling to Old San Juan must drive through Hato Rey.

Economy

Important buildings in Hato Rey include the Banco Popular headquarters, which in 1965 was the tallest building in Hato Rey. Plaza Las Américas, a large mall is located in Hato Rey, and the Roberto Clemente Coliseum. Puerto Rico's FBI headquarters are also located in Hato Rey. Because of the area's closeness to the airport, major airlines, such as Avianca, have offices in Hato Rey.

Compaq at one point operated its Puerto Rico offices in Hato Rey.

Government and infrastructure
The Federal Office Building, a U.S. Federal Courthouse, and the Federal Bureau of Investigation (FBI) San Juan field office are in Hato Rey.

The Puerto Rico Department of Education is headquartered in Hato Rey.

References

External links

Río Piedras, Puerto Rico